Sandrine Jaquet (born 14 April 1971) is a Swiss former professional tennis player.

Jaquet reached a best ranking of 170 in the world on the professional tour. In 1988, as a 17-year-old, she played two Federation Cup ties for Switzerland, against the United States and Great Britain. She made her only grand slam main draw appearance at the 1989 Australian Open, where she competed in both the singles and doubles.

ITF finals

Singles: 2 (1–1)

Doubles: 3 (1–2)

See also
List of Switzerland Fed Cup team representatives

References

External links
 
 
 

1971 births
Living people
Swiss female tennis players